Cremastra appendiculata is an orchid species in the genus Cremastra. It is the type species of its genus.

There two subspecies:
 Cremastra appendiculata var. appendiculata - Taiwan, Tibet, Yunnan, Bhutan, Assam, Nepal, Japan, Korea, Thailand, Vietnam
 Cremastra appendiculata var. variabilis (Blume) I.D.Lund - Kuril, Sakhalin, Japan, Korea, Thailand, Vietnam, Anhui, Chongqing, Gansu, Guangdong, Guangxi, Guizhou, Henan, Hubei, Hunan, Jiangsu, Jiangxi, Shaanxi, Shanxi, Sichuan, Zhejiang

5,7-Dihydroxy-3-(3-hydroxy-4-methoxybenzyl)-chroman-4-one, a homoisoflavanone extracted from C. appendiculata, has anti-angiogenic activities and inhibits UVB-induced skin inflammation through reduced cyclooxygenase-2 expression and NF-?B nuclear localization.

References

External links 

appendiculata
Orchids of China
Plants described in 1904